Saxman Totem Park is a public park in the city of Saxman, Alaska, just south of Ketchikan in southeastern Alaska.  The park is home to a collection of totem poles, some of which are old poles relocated to this place from unoccupied Tlingit villages in the region, or were reconstructed by skilled Tlingit carvers under the auspices of the Civilian Conservation Corps in the 1930s.  The poles originated in the communities of Old Tongass, Cat Island, Village Island, Pennock Island, and Fox Village.  One of the carved items recovered from unoccupied villages is a marble statue of a grizzly bear.  The park was listed on the National Register of Historic Places in 1979.

List of totem poles, monuments and house posts
Sun and Raven
Raven and Frog
Tired-Wolf House Posts
The Beaver Posts
The Blackfish Pole
Klawak Blackfish Fin
The Frog Tree
Grizzly Bear Monument
Kats and his Bear Wife
The Lincoln Totem
Secretary of State Pole
Raven Pole
The Grizzly Bear Post
The Loon Tree
Owl Memorial
Pointing Figure
Giant Rock Oyster Pole
Memorials of Eagle Tail House
Dogfish Totem

External links

 Saxman Totem Park at The Living New Deal Project

See also
Totem Heritage Center in Ketchikan, which also has a collection of historic totem poles
National Register of Historic Places listings in Ketchikan Gateway Borough, Alaska

References

1939 establishments in Alaska
Civilian Conservation Corps in Alaska
Parks on the National Register of Historic Places in Alaska
Protected areas established in 1939
Totem poles in the United States
Tourist attractions in Ketchikan Gateway Borough, Alaska
Historic districts on the National Register of Historic Places in Alaska
National Register of Historic Places in Ketchikan Gateway Borough, Alaska